Dominik Kalata, SJ, (19 May 1925 in Nowa Biała – 23 August 2018) was a Slovakian Roman Catholic prelate, who served as a titular bishop of Semta. Kalata was ordained a Catholic priest on 12 August 1951 and clandestinely as bishop on 9 September 1955 by Ján Chryzostom Korec, SJ, because of the Communist Government of Czechoslovakia and the persecution of the Roman Catholic Church by the government. On 16 March 1985 he was appointed titular bishop.

Kalata died on 23 August 2018 in Ivanka pri Dunaji, Slovakia.

References

1925 births
2018 deaths
Slovak Jesuits
Jesuit bishops
Roman Catholic bishops in Czechoslovakia
20th-century Roman Catholic titular bishops
People from Nowy Targ County